The 1919–20 Maltese First Division was the ninth season of the Maltese First Division and was won for the first time by Sliema Wanderers.

League table

Results

See also 
 1919 in association football
 1920 in association football

1919-20
1919–20 in European association football leagues
1919 in Malta
1920 in Malta